is a 2003 tactical role-playing game developed and published by Square (now Square Enix) for the Nintendo Game Boy Advance. A spin-off of the Final Fantasy series, the game shares several traits with 1997's Final Fantasy Tactics, although it is not a direct sequel. The player assembles a clan of characters, and controls their actions over grid-like battlefields. Players are mostly free to decide the classes, abilities, and statistics of their characters.

The game's story centers on four children; Marche, Mewt, Ritz, and Doned, who live in a small town named St. Ivalice. The children are transported to a realm of the same name as their town, "Ivalice", after discovering an ancient magical book. The story then focuses on the exploits of Marche as he attempts to return to the real world while facing opposition from those around him.

Tactics Advance is one of the initial products from the cooperation of Square and Nintendo made for the Game Boy Advance console; it was developed by the team brought over from the game company Quest Corporation. Following its release, Tactics Advance-themed merchandise was introduced. The game was positively received. It has a sequel, Final Fantasy Tactics A2: Grimoire of the Rift for the Nintendo DS.

Tactics Advance was re-released for the Nintendo Wii U Virtual Console in 2016; on January 28 for Europe, Australia and North America with Japan on March 30.

Gameplay

In Tactics Advance, turn-based tactical battles take place on a three-dimensional isometric field. The player takes the role of Marche, a clan leader; he must organize the clan's members and advance their status through missions that are offered in pubs. The player competes against the computer's team in turn-based play, although unlike Final Fantasy Tactics characters execute their actions instantly.

Missions are tasks undertaken by a clan. There are four types of missions: regular, encounter, dispatch, and area. In regular missions, Marche's entire party ventures to a particular location to do battle. Many of these missions are used to advance the story. In encounter missions, Marche's group battles a rival mercenary clan by purchasing a mission or meeting them on the map. In dispatch missions, which do not involve battle, Marche temporarily sends away one member from his party. Area missions are usually a dispatch mission where Marche's clan can liberate certain regions to obtain bonuses and discounts at shops.

Some missions, typically dispatch missions, require a special item to be in possession in order to accept the mission. Others require a dispatch character to have a specific job class. In regards to items, this may mean another mission must be done to get an item that would allow you to perform the later mission.

The world map is initially empty except for the starting location; it is customized as the player wins location "tokens" after certain missions. These tokens represent different terrains and settlements, such as plains, mountains, deserts, forests, and towns, that can be placed in slots on the world map. Items are rewarded to the player depending on the placement of the tokens. Ivalice also introduces areas called , lawless slums that Judges avoid.  is a German word which means the hunt.  are the only places in the game in which a character can die; everywhere else, they are protected from death by the Judges and are simply knocked out.

Tactics Advance also offers multiplayer capability for two players. Players may cooperate or compete using a link-cable peripheral, and also trade items and party members. Additional missions and items are also offered when players link.

Job system

There are 34 "jobs" in Tactics Advance that govern a character's stats, equipment, and abilities. Most items that can be equipped have various abilities assigned to them, each available for use by characters of a certain job while the item is equipped. When a battle is completed, characters will receive Ability Points (AP) distributed over their currently equipped weapons or items (such as armor). Once a target amount of AP has been accumulated for a given ability, the character will master that ability, allowing the character to use them at any time, regardless of items equipped and job chosen. Mastery of abilities in different jobs will eventually allow the character access to more jobs. For example, if a human unit wishes to change jobs to Paladin, it needs to master at least two "action" abilities from the Soldier job.

Units have a primary job which determines the stat boosts they receive when they level up and the attributes associated with that class. A unit may also have a secondary job set of abilities, where it can use any abilities of the selected job, but with the stat profile of the primary job. For example, an Assassin with a Sniper secondary job could use abilities from both jobs, but has the stat profile and appearance of an Assassin, its primary job. This may deny the use of some abilities depending on their equipped weapon. In the previous example, any abilities that require the possession of a great bow, will not be allowed for use if the character has a Katana equipped.

Tactics Advance also introduces five playable races: Humans, the small rodentlike Moogles, the strong lizard-like Bangaa, the agile rabbit-like Viera, and the magically-skilled Nu Mou. Certain jobs are only available to certain races. Along with the abilities obtained with experience, each race has a guardian beast called a "Totema" to represent whom and which can be summoned to whose aid when a member of that race has 10 Judge Points, that is after your clan has defeated that Totema as part of the main story line.

Laws
One arbitrary game mechanic of Tactics Advance is the Laws system. Laws are set by Judges, invincible arbiters present at each battle, with some exceptions.  Laws may forbid the use of certain weapons, items, elemental spells, or status changes. Breaking a law results in punishment by Carding, the receipt of a red or yellow card. Imprisonment happens if a character infringes a law twice or knocks out another unit with a forbidden ability or weapon. However,  have no Judges or laws; units knocked out in the  will die and permanently leave the clan if they are not revived by the end of the battle.

To offset the difficulty of having things forbidden for use, there are certain things that are recommended by the Judges, and therefore grant Judge Points if used. Judge Points (JP) are used to carry out combos with nearby allies or to summon a Totema. JP are also received upon knocking out an opponent. Later in the game, the player gains the ability to use law cards, which can add laws, and anti-law cards, which can nullify laws that are already in effect.

Plot

Characters
The story of Tactics Advance revolves around three primary characters: Marche Radiuju, the main character who battles the dream worlds of his friends; Ritz Malheur, a stubborn girl who speaks her mind and changes sides in her struggle for self-acceptance; and Mewt Randell, a boy whose mother died that discovers a magical entity that changes the world into the world of Ivalice. There are also secondary characters, such as Doned Radiuju, Marche's little brother who does not desire to return to the real world, since he is sick in the real world and healthy in the dream one; and Cid Randell, Mewt's father who becomes the Judgemaster of Ivalice.

Within Ivalice, there are other characters that help advance the plot. Some characters befriended Marche, such as the moogles Montblanc and Nono; Ezel Berbier, a Nu Mou troublemaker and self-proclaimed genius; and Shara, a Viera archer who befriends Ritz. There are other characters who antagonize Marche, including Babus Swain, a Nu Mou Royal mage in Mewt's service; Llednar Twem, a mysterious enforcer who replaces the Judges when they become independent of the Palace; and Queen Remedi, who is the ruler of Ivalice and was in the Gran Grimoire itself in a form modeled after Mewt's deceased mother.

Story

Ivalice is a world created by four ordinary children: Marche Radiuju, a new student and resident of St. Ivalice and its school; Mewt Randell, a shy boy still attached to the memory of his late mother; Ritz Malheur, an assertive and outspoken classmate of Marche and Mewt; and Doned Radiuju, Marche's younger, handicapped brother and a big fan of fantasy novels and video games. Mewt comes across a dusty old tome in a local used bookstore and eagerly wishes to show it to his friends. Unaware that the book is the legendary Gran Grimoire, Mewt brings the book over to Marche's house along with Ritz. The old book is written in a language none of them have ever seen before, and a single inscription reads: "Alta oron, Sondus kameela". The next morning, Marche wakes up in the world of Ivalice. The fantasy Ivalice is supposedly a reincarnation of Mewt's memories from a Final Fantasy game.

Marche is separated from the others, and immediately begins a quest to return home. Even after realizing how much better his life is in the new Ivalice, he believes that none of it is real and is even more determined to return to his home when he realizes that everyone in town has been dragged into the dream as well, many of whom are now suffering under Mewt's rule or are being slaughtered by the adventuring Clans that populate the world. The other children, and Mewt's father Cid, slowly realize through Marche's efforts that the world has been shaped according to their wishes. Mewt is no longer being teased, is reunited with his deceased mother, and is now the Prince of Ivalice; Ritz no longer has her white albinic hair, instead having the silky red hair which she always wanted; Doned can now walk and is no longer sickly; Marche is suddenly athletic and popular; Cid is the highest-ranking official in the nation; and all of them now live in Final Fantasy, the video game the children all love.

Eventually Marche succeeds in his quest to return Ivalice to normal. He achieves this by destroying the crystals, or world threads, of Ivalice, defeating Llednar Twem (the manifestation of Mewt's negative emotions), and killing the Li-Grim, the physical manifestation of the book's wish-based magic that had been masquerading as Mewt's mother, Queen Remedi. He teaches the other children in the process that they cannot live in fantasy but must learn to live with their misfortunes in reality. The other children are wiser from the experience, as the ending reveals them all to have become happy with themselves.

In addition to the main plot, there are two side plots: the Redwing Arc and the Judge Arc. The Redwing Arc centers around the Redwings clan, a foreign crime ring, their subordinate clan Borzoi, and their smuggled foreign monsters. The other is the Judge Arc, unlockable after beating the main three hundred missions. This serves as an alternative ending where Marche never goes on his quest and stays in Ivalice, overthrows several corrupt judges, and becomes next in line for Cid's judge sword.

Development
Rumors of the game's development began when Square announced its publishing agreement with Nintendo, and was later confirmed by the producer Matsuno. The development team of Tactics Advance, Square's Product Development Division 4, was constructed from employees of Quest Corporation, and work began in February 2002. This comes after Quest announced the handover of its software development team to Square, of which the former is famed for its Tactics Ogre series. Initially thought of as a port of Final Fantasy Tactics, Tactics Advance is developed with an entirely new storyline and setting, and received significant changes to make it more user-friendly for the GBA handheld console; e.g. a quick-save function.

Final Fantasy Tactics Advance uses the gameplay of Final Fantasy Tactics, but introduced certain changes such as a customizable map for the world of Ivalice. While built for the Game Boy Advance, Final Fantasy Tactics Advance graphics are vibrantly colored and extensively detailed, and though environments and characters are wholly sprite-based, facial expressions are easily identifiable and many motion frames have been given to create a smooth animation. The game also introduced an option to switch between three display modes. Two of the modes are optimized for gameplay on Game Boy Advance and the new Game Boy Advance SP respectively, and there's also a TV mode for better color display while playing this game into a television screen by using a Game Boy Player which, must be attached to a GameCube for this to work.

In Japan, Final Fantasy Tactics Advance story was expanded and broadcast in Japanese radio stations. The radio drama entitled Final Fantasy Tactics Advance Radio Edition was broadcast in four radio stations within Japan from early January to late March 2003.

Music

The music in Final Fantasy Tactics Advance was primarily composed by Hitoshi Sakimoto, with additional music contributed by Kaori Ohkoshi and Ayako Saso; Nobuo Uematsu provided the main theme. The Final Fantasy Tactics Advance Original Soundtrack album was released by DigiCube on February 19, 2003. It spans 74 tracks and has a duration of 2:05:27. The first disk includes every song from the game, as it sounds through the Game Boy Advance hardware. The second disk contains fully orchestrated versions of 32 of the same 42 tracks. A new age arrangement album entitled White: Melodies of Final Fantasy Tactics Advance, a selection of musical tracks from the game arranged by Yo Yamazaki, Akira Sasaki, and Satoshi Henmi, was released by SME Visual Works on February 26, 2003. White spans 11 tracks and has a duration of 46:10. Within the game, the classical-themed soundtrack is compressed into MIDI file format. Simple sound effects are used during battles, and there are no voices or speech within the game.

Reception

Final Fantasy Tactics Advance sold over 440,000 copies during its year of release in Japan, with nearly 225,000 units being sold in its first week alone. By August 2004, more than 1 million units of the game were sold in North America and Europe together. In the United States alone, the game sold 660,000 copies and earned $22 million by August 2006. During the period between January 2000 and August 2006, it was the 40th highest-selling game launched for the Game Boy Advance, Nintendo DS or PlayStation Portable in that country.

The game was well received among the gaming community, widely regarded to feature an outstanding combination of music, graphics, gameplay, and storyline. Final Fantasy Tactics Advance won Best Handheld Game at the 7th Annual Interactive Achievement Awards in 2004. GameSpot named it the best Game Boy Advance game of September 2003. It was also rated as outstanding by IGN (9.0 out of 10) and given 5 out of 5 by GameSpy. In 2007, Final Fantasy Tactics Advance was named 14th best Game Boy Advance game of all time in IGN's feature reflecting on the Game Boy Advance's long lifespan. It was also rated the 67th best game made on a Nintendo System in Nintendo Power Top 200 Games list. Final Fantasy Tactics Advance was also nominated for NAVGTR Award for Strategy Game of The Year Category, but lost to Command & Conquer: Generals for Windows 9x compatible-PC.

Reviewers were pleased with graphics and visuals of Final Fantasy Tactics Advance; GameSpot added that the battles are "clear and colorful", and character jobs are easily identified, though gameplay becomes slow when too many character sprites are in one screen. The gameplay is also lauded for retaining the elements of Tactics Ogre yet offers freedom to players to develop characters as they wish. GameNOW said that the game "lives up to its legacy—and then some", and called it "easily one of the best GBA games around". Criticism was directed at the game's menu, which was cluttered with complicated options in organizing the clan members, and did not detail out statistics for characters and equipment. Some reviewers thought there are too many character jobs since some jobs overlap one another and certain abilities are redundant.

Legacy
In 2007, a sequel to Final Fantasy Tactics Advance was released for the Nintendo DS as part of the Ivalice Alliance series, Final Fantasy Tactics A2: Grimoire of the Rift. While the story focuses on different characters than Advance, several characters from the game appear in cameo roles, such as Montblanc and Mewt. Montblanc also appears in Final Fantasy XII as the leader of Clan Centurio.

To commemorate the release of Final Fantasy Tactics Advance in Japan, several pieces of merchandise were introduced exclusive for the region: web money cards, posters, character card collections and a set of twenty pin badges. Square and Nintendo released a limited-edition Final Fantasy Tactics Advance-themed Game Boy Advance SP package to commemorate the game and the console's launching in February 2003. A Japanese-exclusive adaptation of the game's story in radio drama form was also released. It was aired from January to March 2003. The series was released by DigiCube on CD in four separate parts, with some changes to plot details.

Notes

References

External links

 Final Fantasy Tactics Advance at Metacritic

2003 video games
Final Fantasy video games
Final Fantasy Tactics
Game Boy Advance games
Interactive Achievement Award winners
Multiplayer and single-player video games
Role-playing video games
Tactical role-playing video games
Video games scored by Hitoshi Sakimoto
Video games developed in Japan
Video games with isometric graphics
Virtual Console games
Portal fantasy
Virtual Console games for Wii U